Abracadabra is the fourth album by English singer-songwriter Claire Hamill, released in 1975. It was more more rocky as a result, probably, of being influenced by the bands she was supporting on tour, such as King Crimson and Traffic. She used her American band for the backing tracks and supplemented them with guitarist Phil Palmer, Ray Davies's nephew.

Track listing 
All tracks composed by Claire Hamill; except where indicated
 "Rory" - 2:50
 "Forbidden Fruit" - 3:00
 "One Sunday Morning" - 3:30
 "I Love You So" (Paul Rodgers, Simon Kirke) - 3:16
 "For Sailors" - 4:22
 "Jamaica" (Traditional; arranged by Claire Hamill) - 2:14
 "Under a Piece of Glass" - 3:11
 "You Dear" (Ian Anderson) - 3:18
 "Maybe It Is" - 4:00
 "In So Deep" - 3:51
 "Celluloid Heroes" (Ray Davies) - 5:00

Personnel
 Claire Hamill - guitar, keyboards, vocals
Phil Palmer - guitar
Phil Chen - bass; ska guitar on "Jamaica"
John Hartmann - keyboards
Gary Ray - drums
Mel Collins - soprano saxophone on "Forbidden Fruit"; brass arrangement
 Vicki Brown, Doreen Chanter - backing vocals on "I Love You So" and "Jamaica"
Jean Roussel - piano on "Under a Piece of Glass", congas and shaker on "One Sunday Morning", tambourine on "In So Deep"; orchestral arrangements
Café Society (Tom Robinson, Raphael Doyle, Hereward Kaye) - vocals on "One Sunday Morning", "Jamaica" and "Celluloid Heroes"
Technical
 Phil McDonald - producer, engineer
Robin Ayling - coordination

References

External links
Claire Hamill's website

Claire Hamill albums
1975 albums